The Museum of the National Bank of Belgium in Brussels, one of the oldest central bank museums in Europe, opened in 1982. It is  divided into three exhibits: the history of money, the history of the National Bank of Belgium, and the interactions between people and money and the design of money. The museum has a collection of old Belgian coins and explains the emergence of currency through the centuries.

Building 
The museum's current building was constructed between 1872 and 1874 to serve as a bank for the Union du Crédit de Bruxelles bank. It was designed by Désiré De Keyser (1823–1897), a Brussels native. In 1969, Union du Crédit de Bruxelles was acquired by the United California Bank. In 1979, the National Bank of Belgium purchased the building and several others nearby. The building was restored between 2004 and 2009. Before its restoration, the building had been severely damaged by dry rot and alterations. The museum has occupied the building since 2018.

See also
 List of museums in Brussels
 National Bank of Belgium

References

External links
  

1982 establishments in Belgium
Museums established in 1982
Museums in Brussels
History museums in Belgium
Numismatic museums in Europe